Banar railway station is a main railway station in Jodhpur district, Rajasthan. Its code is BNO. The station serves Banar town and consists of a single platform. The platform is not well sheltered and lacks many facilities including water and sanitation. It is located approximately 14 km from Jodhpur railway station. The railway station is under the administrative control of North Western Railway of Indian Railways.

Major trains 
Some of the important trains that run from Banar are:

 Jodhpur–Rewari Passenger
 Jodhpur–Bilara Passenger
 Jodhpur–Bhopal Passenger
 Jodhpur–Hisar DEMU
 Abohar–Jodhpur Passenger

References

Railway stations in Jodhpur district
Transport in Jodhpur
Jodhpur railway division
Buildings and structures in Jodhpur
Jodhpur